Gani Mammadov residence is a former residential building located in Icherisheher – the historical district of Baku, on 45 Asaf Zeynalli Str. It is considered an architectural monument of local importance.

History 
Built in 1908, on the site of a 1646 madrasah, from which only one stone portal has survived that now is used as an entrance to a miniature souvenir shop.

Gani Mamedov, a successful cotton trader, owner of sea-going vessels for the transportation of goods in the Caspian Sea between Russia, Central Asia and Iran, has ordered the construction of the residence. The project of the house was carried out by an Armenian architect Nikolai Georgievich Baev (1878–1949), a graduate of the St. Petersburg Civil Engineering Institute (1901), who then built the Opera House in Baku (1910) and a hospital (named after Nagiyev.

The three-story house was built in 1908–1909 and was restored starting in the 1990s by the Mobil company with assistance from the Baku Historical Society.

In cinematography 
Fragments of the "Tehran-43" movie were filmed in the Gani Mammadov residence.

See also 
 Ismailiyya Palace
 Mitrofanov Residence
 Property of Haji Mustafa Rasulov

References

Architecture in Azerbaijan
Houses in Azerbaijan
Buildings and structures in Baku
Icherisheher